Vladimir Shuvalov (3 October 1946 – 8 February 2019) was a Soviet freestyle swimmer who won a silver medal at the 1966 European Aquatics Championships. He also competed at the 1964 Summer Olympics and finished fourth in the 4 × 100 m medley and sixth in the 4 × 100 m freestyle relay. Between 1963 and 1966 he set 12 national records in the 100 m and 4 × 100 m freestyle and 200 m and 4 × 100 m medley events.

References

1946 births
Russian male swimmers
Living people
Swimmers at the 1964 Summer Olympics
Russian male freestyle swimmers
Soviet male swimmers
Olympic swimmers of the Soviet Union
European Aquatics Championships medalists in swimming
Swimmers from Moscow